Shih Chi-yang (5 May 1935 – 5 May 2019) was a Taiwanese politician. He was Vice Premier of the Republic of China from 1988 to 1993 and convener of the Executive Yuan's Mainland Affairs Committee, which was established in 1988, and became the first Minister of the Mainland Affairs Council of the Executive Yuan when it was established in 1991. He was President of the Judicial Yuan from 1994 to 1999.

Shih died at home in Sanxia District, New Taipei, of multiple organ failure on 5 May 2019.

Family
He was married to Jeanne Li.

Awards
 2013, Order of Propitious Clouds with Special Grand Cordon

References

1935 births
2019 deaths
Taiwanese Ministers of Justice
National Taiwan University alumni
Heidelberg University alumni
Taiwanese Presidents of the Judicial Yuan
Politicians of the Republic of China on Taiwan from Changhua County
Deaths from multiple organ failure
20th-century Taiwanese politicians
Recipients of the Order of Propitious Clouds